This list of notable Regent College alumni and faculty includes notable individuals who teach, have taught, or studied at Regent College.

Full-time faculty
 Cindy Aalders, Library Director; Assistant Professor of the History of Christianity
 Craig M. Gay, Professor of Interdisciplinary Studies
 Mark Glanville, Associate Professor of Pastoral Theology
 Jeffrey P. Greenman, President; Professor of Theology and Ethics
 George H. Guthrie, Professor of New Testament
 Ross Hastings, Sangwoo Youtong Chee Chair Associate Professor of Pastoral Theology
 Bruce Hindmarsh, James Houston Professor of Spiritual Theology; Professor of the History of Christianity
 Mariam J. Kovalishyn, Assistant Professor of New Testament Studies
 Don Lewis, Professor of Church History
 Grace Hui Liang, Director of Chinese Studies Program; Associate Professor, Chinese Christian Studies
 Matthew Lynch, Assistant Professor in Old Testament
 Rhonda McEwen, Director of Regent Exchange; Associate Professor of Education and Culture
 Iain W. Provan, Marshall Sheppard Professor of Biblical Studies
 Paul Spilsbury, Academic Dean; Professor of New Testament
 Diane Stinton, Dean of Students; Associate Professor of Mission Studies and World Christianity
 Jens Zimmermann, J. I. Packer Professor of Theology

Emeriti & Retired
 Carl Armerding, Old Testament
 Thena Ayers, Adult Education; Dean of Students
 Gordon Fee, New Testament Studies
 W. Ward Gasque, Biblical Studies
 Maxine Hancock, Interdisciplinary Studies; Spiritual Theology
James M. Houston, Board of Governors' Professor; Spiritual Theology
 Phil Long, Old Testament
J.I. Packer, Board of Governors' Professor; Theology
 Charles R. Ringma, Missions; Evangelism
 Sven Soderlund, Biblical Studies
 Paul Stevens, Marketplace Theology and Leadership
 John B. Toews, Church History; Anabaptist Studies
Bruce Waltke, Old Testament Studies
 Loren Wilkinson, Inderdisiciplinary Studies and Philosophy
 Edwin Hui, Chee Family Dean of Chinese Students; Professor of Bioethics, Christianity and Chinese Culture

Current and former fellows & scholars-in-residence
 Paul Barnett, bishop
 Marva Dawn, theologian
 Preston Manning, politician, Senior Fellow at the Marketplace Institute
 Alister McGrath, theologian, Teaching Fellow
 Luci Shaw, poet, remains a writer-in-residence at Regent College

Summer programs
The following faculty are among those who regularly teach as visiting faculty during Regent College Summer Programs.

 Lynn H. Cohick, Academic Dean and Professor of New Testament at Northern Seminary
 Michael J. Gorman, Raymond E. Brown Chair in Biblical Studies at St. Mary's Seminary & University
 Malcolm Guite, English poet and priest
 Mark Noll, historian
 Susan S. Philips, Executive Director and Professor of Sociology and Christianity at New College Berkeley
 W. David O. Taylor, Associate Professor of Theology at Fuller Theological Seminary
 John H. Walton, Professor of Old Testament at Wheaton College (Illinois)

Notable graduates

Academia
 Nigel Biggar, Regius Professor of Moral and Pastoral Theology, Oxford University
 Markus Bockmuehl, Oxford University professor
 Christopher A. Hall, Chancellor of Eastern University (United States)

Arts and media
 Carolyn Arends
 Eugene H. Peterson, pastor and writer
 Gary Thomas, author
 Kathy Tyers, author

Clergy
 Walter Kim, Presbyterian Church in America minister and president of National Association of Evangelicals
 Felix Orji, bishop of the Anglican Diocese of All Nations
 Andrew Shie, assistant bishop of the Anglican Diocese of Kuching (Sarawak and Brunei Darussalam), first Anglican Bishop from Brunei

Other
 Mike Baird, former premier of New South Wales
 Joshua Harris, author of I Kissed Dating Goodbye

References

Academic staff of Regent College
Regent College